Lygosoma peninsulare is a species of skink found in Malaysia.

References

Lygosoma
Reptiles described in 2018
Endemic fauna of Malaysia
Reptiles of the Malay Peninsula
Taxa named by Larry Lee Grismer
Taxa named by Evan Quah
Taxa named by Zaharil Duzulkafly
Taxa named by Paul Yambun